Nano–Mugen Compilation 2009 is a compilation album released by Asian Kung-Fu Generation to advertise their eighth annual Nano-Mugen Festival held at the Yokohama Arena through July 19-20th.

Track listing
 – Asian Kung-Fu Generation
"Zak and Sara" – Ben Folds
"Stereotypes" - Farrah
"Oats We Sow" – Gregory and the Hawk
"Suburban Knights" – Hard-Fi
"Silver Birch" – The Hiatus
"Morning Sun" – Ryujin Kiyoshi
"Surrender" – Lostage
"Everything Must Go" – Manic Street Preachers
"Marm" – Mudy on the Sakuban
"Weightless" – Nada Surf
 – Ogre You Asshole
 – Sakanaction
"8823" – Spitz
"Magic Blue Van" – Straightener
"Rock Star (Understand)" – The Young Punx
 – Unicorn

External links
 CDJapan
 Nano-Mugen official website 
 Nano-Mugen official website 

Asian Kung-Fu Generation albums
2009 compilation albums